Pyo Chit Lin, also known as My Darling is one of the very few Myanmmar classics still in existence, and is the country’s earliest surviving colour film, directed by Shwe Baw, starring Phoe Par Lay, Phoe Par Gyi and Kyu Kyu.

Synopsis
This romantic comedy revolves around two friends who move to Yangon to look for work. They meet a beautiful young woman named Kyu Kyu, who lives with her aunt since her parents passed away. Though she is rich and owns her own company, Kyu Kyu is humble and attracts the attention of several suitors, including a police officer, an air force captain, and a writer. Starring many of the major Burmese actors of the time, the film is a precious document of the prolific and vibrant movie industry in Myanmmar then.

Cast
Po Par Lay
Phoe Par Gyi
Kyu Kyu

References

1950 films
1950s Burmese-language films
Burmese romantic comedy films
Films shot in Myanmar
1950 romantic comedy films